Seal's sportive lemur (Lepilemur seali), or the Anjanaharibe-Sud sportive lemur, is a sportive lemur endemic to Madagascar. Seal's sportive lemur is found in northeastern Madagascar, living in primary and secondary mid-altitude rainforests .

References

Sportive lemurs
Mammals described in 2006